Massachusetts House of Representatives' 4th Hampden district in the United States is one of 160 legislative districts included in the lower house of the Massachusetts General Court. It covers the city of Westfield in Hampden County. Democrat John Velis of Westfield represented the district from 2014 to 2020. Candidates for this district seat in the 2020 Massachusetts general election include Independent Conservative Dan Allie, Democrat Matt Garlo, and Republican Kelly Pease.

The current district geographic boundary overlaps with that of the Massachusetts Senate's 2nd Hampden and Hampshire district.

Representatives
 Marvin Chapin, circa 1858 
 Joseph Stone, circa 1859 
 Jeremiah J. Keane, circa 1888 
 Chauncey A. Bennett, circa 1920 
 Julius F. Carman, circa 1920 
 Walter Frank Szetela, circa 1951 
 John F. Coffey, circa 1975 
 Steven Pierce
 Michael Knapik
 Cele Hahn
 Donald Humason Jr.
 John Velis, April 16, 2014 – May 28, 2020 
 Kelly Pease, 2021-

Former locale
The district previously covered part of Springfield, circa 1872.

See also
 List of Massachusetts House of Representatives elections
 Other Hampden County districts of the Massachusetts House of Representatives: 1st, 2nd, 3rd, 5th, 6th, 7th, 8th, 9th, 10th, 11th, 12th
 Hampden County districts of the Massachusett Senate: Berkshire, Hampshire, Franklin, and Hampden; Hampden; 1st Hampden and Hampshire; 2nd Hampden and Hampshire
 List of Massachusetts General Courts
 List of former districts of the Massachusetts House of Representatives

Images
Portraits of legislators

References

Further reading

External links
 Ballotpedia. Massachusetts House of Representatives Fourth Hampden District
  (State House district information based on U.S. Census Bureau's American Community Survey).

House
Government of Hampden County, Massachusetts